Eric Rosen may refer to:

 Erik Rosén (1883–1967), Swedish film actor
 Eric S. Rosen (born 1953), American judge
 Eric Rosen (playwright) (born 1970), American theater director and playwright
 Eric Rosen (chess player) (born 1993), American chess player and streamer